The Church of St. Nicholas (known locally as the Serbian Orthodox Church), is a Serbian Orthodox church in Szeged, Hungary.

History
Many Serbs moved to Szeged in the centuries after the Battle of Kosovo. After the restoration of the Serbian Patriarchate of Peć in 1557, Szeged became the county town of the Eparchy of Bačka. A wooden Serbian church was built in the city at the beginning of the 16th century, but was destroyed by fire when the Turkish army was expelled.

After the liberation of Szeged from the Ottoman Empire in 1686, Serbs moved to the region in greater numbers. In Szeged, they mostly lived in the Palánk and Upper Town areas. A draft of Csongrád County from 1720 shows that out of 404 buildings, 40 were in Serbian possession. The city's second Serbian Orthodox church, dedicated to Saint Nicholas, was built from stone in the Palánk in 1690. It stood for only 25 years before it was demolished in 1715 to rebuild the city's castle.

The third Orthodox church, a small structure, was built in 1725 at the site of the contemporary church. The fourth, dedicated to the archangels Gabriel and Michael, stood in the Upper Town. Its deed of foundation is from 1727, but it is more likely that it was built during the Turkish occupation or after the liberation of Szeged. It was attended by Greeks as well as Serbs, and remained in regular use until 1848. After that, community members began to join the present-day Church of St. Nicholas instead. The previous church was heavily damaged in a flood in 1879 and was soon destroyed.

The fifth church, today's Church of St. Nicholas, was built rapidly near the site of the third one, behind Votive Church in Dóm Square. The building was designed by Jovan Dobić, and two German masters from Pest, a tinsmith and a carpenter, built the tower. A painter from Buda, Mihailo Sokolović, decorated it with gold and paintings.

Bishop Arsenije Radojević of Szeged, Novi Sad and Eger gave his blessing for the church in 1775, but it is not known exactly when the builders got permission to begin construction. The base was consecrated on 11 July 1778, and a lead tablet recording this event was built into the basement of the church, with a paper copy filed in the church's historical archive. The nave was completed in 1780, and the tower in 1781; during the building of the tower, another lead plaque was built into the church, also with a paper copy for the archive. The five bells were consecrated in 1781. The interior took longer to finish, and it was not until 1805 that Bishop Jovan Jovanović sanctified the church.

Iconostasis
The iconostasis, which divides the altar from the nave, is the most ornate part of the church. Designed in the rococo style, it consists of 74 icons. The upper part was made by unknown artists. The lower part was originally made for Szeged's third church by Jovan Popović, a Serbian Baroque artist, as recorded in a contract from 7 June 1761. The numbers "1761" are also written on the icon depicting the Temptation of Christ.

The two side doors in the iconostasis, called the Deacon's Doors, are for those who help in the liturgy. The left (northern) door depicts Moses, and the right (southern) door shows his brother, Aaron. Above Moses, there is a depiction of Melchizedek's sacrifice; above Aaron is a depiction of Abraham's sacrifice.

At the center is the King's Door, used by the priests. At the top, Gabriel is shown with a lily in his hands, next to the Virgin Mary. This is a depiction of the Annunciation, in which Gabriel informed Mary that she would give birth to Jesus. Below are the Four Evangelists: Matthew with an angel, John with a hawk, Luke with a bull and Mark with a lion. A snake, symbolizing the bronze snake from the Bible, is depicted climbing up the door. Above the door, an eye in a triangle represents the eye of God.

To the right (south) of the King's Door is an icon of Jesus Christ, and to the left is one of the Virgin Mary and the baby Jesus. Next to the icon of Jesus Christ is one of John the Baptist, and next to the Virgin Mary's icon is one of Saint Nicholas, the patron of the church. It is usual for these four icons, known as the throne icons, to be the most decorated in Orthodox churches. Hanging in front of the throne icons are four lanterns from Mount Athos and from Russia, decorated with the images of the crucified Jesus, Saint George and detailed plant motifs. The Last Supper is depicted above the King's Door. At the bottom, between the throne icons, there are two smaller icons: the Flight into Egypt between Saint Nicholas and the Virgin Mary, and the Temptation of Christ between Jesus and John the Baptist. The holiday icons—one large icon surrounded by eight smaller ones—are above the throne icons. The Transfiguration of Jesus is on the left (north) side. Around it, moving counterclockwise, are icons showing the Epiphany, Palm Sunday (Jesus' triumphal entry into Jerusalem), the Presentation of Jesus at the Temple, the Annunciation, the birth of John the Baptist, the Circumcision of Christ, the Dormition of the Mother of God, and the Presentation of Mary at the Temple. The Resurrection of Jesus is depicted on the right (south) side, and counterclockwise around it are the Birth of Christ, the beheading of John the Baptist, the protection of the Virgin Mary, the stoning of Saint Stephen, the resurrection of Lazarus of Bethany, the Pentecost and the Visitation.

The Father, the Son and the Holy Spirit, illustrated as a dove, are painted below the red frame, and the Evangelists are depicted in red and blue around them. Other icons show the Apostles and the Church Fathers. In the lunette above the red stave is a crucifix; on the left, the Virgin Mary and John the Apostle can be seen at Jesus' feet. The rest of the icons depict the prophets from the Old Testament, and at the top of the wall, the Last Judgment is painted.

The church sustained heavy damage in the flood of 1879, and was renovated from 1880 to 1881. During the renovation, the little-known Slovak artist Jan Hodina painted a fresco on the ceiling depicting the creation of the world.

List of priests

Image gallery

References
II. János Pál Pápa körlevele megemlékezésül Szent Cirill és Metód evangelizációs munkájának 1100. évfordulója alkalmából (fordította Dr. Kiss László), Szent István Társulat, Az Apostoli Szentszék Könyvkiadója, Budapest, 1986,  Összkiadás 294 7 XIII. kötet
Apró Ferenc – Péter László: Szeged útikönyv, Grimm kiadó, 2014, 92–93. pages
Balogh Ádám – Kaplan Pavle – Purosz Alexandrosz: Szegedi Görög Füzetek 8. – Szerbek és görögök a XVIII-XIX.- századi Szegeden – Adalékok a felsővárosi "kis cerkó" történetéhez (Magyarországi Görögök Kulturális Egyesülete Csongrád Megyei Helyi Csoport, Szeged, 2014)
Csongrád Megye Építészeti Emlékei, szerkesztette: Tóth Ferenc, Szeged, 2000, Kiadja a Csongrád Megyei Önkormányzat, Felelős kiadó: Dr. Frank József, 371–372. pages
Csongrád megyei útikönyv, Szeged Tourist Idegenforgalmi Hivatal, 1984, 138–140. pages
Динко Давидов: Иконе Српских цркава у Мађарској, Нови Сад, 1973, 12, 13, 20, 48, 64–66, 128–129, 151, 197–200, 229, 230. pages
Dujmov Milán – Szalai-Nagy Márta: Magyarországi ortodox templomok, A szerzők magánkiadása, Budapest 2010, 74. page
Helmuth Von Glasenapp: Az öt világvallás (fordította: Pálvölgyi Endre), harmadik kiadás, Gondolat Budapest, 1981, 241–368. pages
Imakönyv az Orthodox keresztények számára (második, javított kiadás), fordította és szerkesztette D. Dr. Berki Feriz protoierej, esperes-adminisztrátor, Budapest, 1987
Képes Kis Biblia - Hitoktatási segédkönyv, válogatta és írta: Keszthelyi Ferenc, VIII. kiadás, Ecclesia Budapest, 
Kulturna istorija Srba u Mađarskoj [CD-ROM], Author teksta: Dr. Dinko Davidov, Urednik: Milan Stepanov, Programmer: Dejan Čičić, Dexsoft Multimedia, 1998
Милан Дујмов – Листа Свештеника Српске Православне Епархије Будимске, (Будимпешта, 2013, Самостално издање аутора), 62–64. pages
Nagy Márta: Ortodox ikonosztázionok Magyarországon, A szerző magánkiadása, 1994, 32–33., 148–149. pages
Péter László: Szeged (Panoráma magyar városok sorozat), Panoráma kiadó, 1981, 82–83. pages
Somorjai Ferenc: Csongrád megye és Szeged, Medicina Könyvkiadó Rt, 1993, 61–62. pages
Somorjai Ferenc: Egy kiemelkedő műemlék – A szegedi szerb templom, Szeged – A város folyóirata (Várostörténeti, kultúrális és közéleti magazin), 12. évfolyam 9. szám 2000. szeptember, Főszerkesztő: Zombori Mihály, Felelős szerkesztő: Tandi Lajos, Kiadja: A Szegedi Városi Televízió KHT., 30–32. pages
Somorjai Ferenc: Szeged (harmadik, javított és bővített kiadás), Panoráma, Magyar városok sorozat, 2002, Medicina Könyvkiadó Rt., 98–102. pages
Стеван Ђурђевић: Срби у Сегедину - Отисак из Споменика CVIII, књига 10, Одељење друштвених наука Српске академије наука, Београд 1960

External links
  Szegedi görög füzetek 8.: III. Ortodox templomok a Palánkban és Felsővároson, különös tekintettel a "kis cerkóra"

18th-century Serbian Orthodox church buildings
Buildings and structures in Csongrád-Csanád County
Churches in Hungary
Serb communities in Hungary
Serbian Orthodox church buildings in Hungary
Szeged
Tourist attractions in Csongrád-Csanád County
18th-century churches in Hungary
Baroque church buildings in Hungary